The Caddo are Native American people in United States.

Caddo may also refer to:

 Caddo (harvestman), a genus of spiders in the Caddidae family
 Caddo language, a language spoken in the Great Plains region of the United States

Places
In the United States
 Caddo, Alabama, an unincorporated community
 Caddo, Missouri, an unincorporated community
 Caddo, Oklahoma, a town
 Caddo, Texas (disambiguation), a list of towns with the name

 Caddo Parish, Louisiana
 Caddo County, Oklahoma

See also
 Caddo Public Schools (disambiguation)
 
Caddy (disambiguation)